Camp Ellis was a United States World War II Army Service Forces Unit Training Center and prisoner-of-war camp between the towns of Bernadotte, Ipava, and Table Grove in Fulton County, Illinois. Construction began on 17 September 1942, and the camp opened on 16 April 1943, with an official dedication 14 July 1943. German prisoners of war were guarded by the 475th and 476th Military Police Escort Guard Companies. Training activities ended in November 1944.

According to the Pentagon Report on Camp Ellis, the camp was officially occupied on 1 February 1943 under the Sixth Service Command.  It included facilities of: USF Unit Training Center, Engineer and Medical Officers Replacement Pools, Training Center & POW Camp.

"Effective as of 1 October 1945 Camp Ellis, Illinois was placed in the Category of surplus (entire camp). 17,478 acres WD owned at cost to Govt (land and buildings of $23,076,438 certified to SPS (WD-#257) 11 October 1945).

Shawnee National Forest, Camp Ellis, Illinois maneuver area, transferred to Department of Agriculture 29 November 1945 (35,375 acres Public Lands).

Effective 11 December 1945 Camp Ellis Military Reservation, Illinois, entire camp 28,557 military housing, 17,455 acres WD owned, at cost to Govt. (land and buildings) of $23,076,438 withdrawn from surplus and placed in inactive revocable license to State of Illinois as National Guard Camp-per Monthly Progress Report, OCE, dated 30 January 1946.

Camp Ellis, Military Reservation, Ill., designated as Class II installation, subject to re-entry upon 120 days' notice, under the jurisdiction of the Commanding General, Army Ground Forces, 22 March 1946.

Effective 25 September 1946 reclassified as a Class I installation under jurisdiction of Commanding General, Fifth Army.

Camp Ellis, Table Grove, Ill., inactive 11 December 1945, except housing surplus 8 January 1947.

5013th ASF, Camp Ellis, Ill. reorganized under T/D #205-1013, Fifth Army, Chicago, Ill. December 1947, and 30 June 1948.

Effective 30 November 1949, Camp Ellis, Ill., less certain facilities to be retained for use by Illinois National Guard, was declared excess to requirements of Department of Army and was approved for disposal (DA Cir120), 1 December 1949." Pentagon Report on Camp Ellis

The camp was named after Sergeant Michael B. Ellis, a World War I Medal of Honor recipient from East Saint Louis, Illinois.

Units Served
 
 3052nd Quartermaster Salvage Col Co.
 738th Engineer Base Depot Company
 567th Engineer Dump Truck Company
 539th Salvage Repair Company
 475th Military Police Escort Guard Company
 476th Military Police Escort Guard Company
 4624th Service Unit ( Wac )
 1303rd Engineer General Service Regiment Activated on 15 July 1943
 123rd Infantry Company A
 1317th Engineer General Service Regiment
 1332nd Engineer Regiment (African-American Unit)
 371st Engineer Construction Battalion
 520th Transportation Battalion
 548th CSB
 600th Quartermaster Company
 533rd CSB
 123rd Infantry
 181st Transportation Battalion Activated 25 June 1943
 16th Company, 133rd Battalion, 30th Training Regiment. Capt. WM. J. Courchesne, 1st Sgt. J. V. Salyard. July 1945
 3184 QUARTERMASTER SERVICE COMPANY APRIL 1944 (African-American Unit Cpl. Howard W. Jones)
 4624th Unit of Women's Army Corps arrive in Camp Ellis 6 January 1944

References

External links
 475th Military Police Escort Guard Company: A Brief History by Gene Herbener
 Elaineandmike.us: Camp Ellis

Civilian Conservation Corps in Illinois
Buildings and structures in Fulton County, Illinois
Closed training facilities of the United States Army
Military installations in Illinois
Populated places established in 1943
World War II prisoner of war camps in the United States
1943 establishments in Illinois